Macrocoma niedobovae is a species of leaf beetle endemic to Socotra. It was described by Stefano Zoia in 2012. It is named after Jana Niedobová, who collected part of the specimens studied.

References

niedobovae
Beetles of Asia
Beetles described in 2012
Endemic fauna of Socotra
Insects of the Arabian Peninsula